The 1967 Ball State Cardinals football team was an American football team that represented Ball State University in the Indiana Collegiate Conference (ICC) during the 1967 NCAA College Division football season.

Schedule

References

Ball State
Ball State Cardinals football seasons
Ball State Cardinals football